VGL may refer to:

 Video Games Live, a concert series
 Vaibhav Global Limited, a retail, wholesale and manufacturing company

See also
 VG1 (disambiguation)
 VGI (disambiguation)
 VG (disambiguation)